Charhyphus is a genus of beetles belonging to the family Staphylinidae.

The species of this genus are found in Northern America.

Species:

Charhyphus arizonensis 
Charhyphus brevicollis 
Charhyphus coeni 
Charhyphus paradoxus 
Charhyphus picipennis

References

Staphylinidae